Denis Godla (born April 4, 1995) is a Slovak professional ice hockey goaltender. He is currently playing for HC Litvínov of the Czech Extraliga. Godla was Slovakia's starting goaltender at the 2015 World Junior Ice Hockey Championships where he led the team to a bronze medal, also being named in the tournament's All-Star team, the tournament's best goaltender, and overall tournament MVP. He won the 2018 Spengler Cup with KalPa

Playing career

KHL
Godla was called up for four games during the 2014-15 KHL season with HC Slovan Bratislava. He struggled during his time there, posting a 0–3–0 record with a .839 save percentage and a 5.17 goals against average.

Mestis
On September 28, 2015 Godla signed a one-year contract with Kokkolan Hermes of the Finnish Mestis league.

International play

Godla was first chosen to represent the Slovakia at the 2013 IIHF World U18 Championships. His first game internationally was against Team Canada, where he let in four goals on 35 shots in a 4–1 loss. Godla would suit up twice more in the tournament, a 4–1 loss to Switzerland and a 6–3 loss to Germany, where he was pulled in favour of Dávid Okoličaný.

Godla went on to represent Slovakia again at the 2015 World Junior Ice Hockey Championship. The Slovaks got off to a rough start, losing 8–0 to the powerhouse Canadians, with Godla once again being pulled for Okoličaný. The following day Godla picked up his first international win in a 2–1 upset of defending champion Finland. Godla continued to impress, making 41 saves in a 3–0 loss to the Americans, followed by 28 saves in a 5–2 victory against Germany. Godla's performance was enough to secure Slovakia a 3rd-place finish in Group A, and a spot in the playoff round. In the Quarterfinals Godla picked up his first shutout in international play in a 3–0 over the Czech Republic. The Semi-Finals saw a 5–1 loss to the Canadians, giving them a berth in the bronze medal game against Sweden. Godla came up big once again, making 26 saves in a 4–2 victory to capture the bronze.

His performance earned Godla tournament MVP, a spot on the tournament All-Star team, and the IIHF best goaltender award.

Career statistics

Regular season and playoffs

International

Awards and honours

References

External links

1995 births
Living people
KalPa players
Kokkolan Hermes players
Iisalmen Peli-Karhut players
People from Kežmarok
Sportspeople from the Prešov Region
ŠHK 37 Piešťany players
Slovak ice hockey goaltenders
HC Slovan Bratislava players
HK Spišská Nová Ves players
HC Litvínov players
Slovak expatriate ice hockey players in the Czech Republic
Slovak expatriate ice hockey players in Finland